The February 2021 massacre in Wukro was a mass extrajudicial killing that took place in Wukro in the Tigray Region of Ethiopia during the Tigray War, on 10 February 2021. Wukro is a mid-sized town, capital of woreda Kilte Awulaelo, Eastern zone of Tigray.

Massacre
The Eritrean Defence Forces killed 18 young protestors in Wukro (Eastern Tigray) on 10 February 2021., as part of a series of killings in this martyr town.

Perpetrators
Relatives and neighbours interpreted the identity of the perpetrators as Eritrean soldiers.

Victims
The “Tigray: Atlas of the humanitarian situation” mentions a total of 18 victims. Many victims have been identified, but, as Wukro is a martyr town, affected by every phase of the Tigray war, the specific event in which victims died is not known yet. The EHRC–OHCHR Tigray investigation reported the massacres in this locality, without going into further detail.

Reactions
The series of massacres in Wukro received international attention in media articles. The “Tigray: Atlas of the humanitarian situation”, that documented this massacre received international media attention, particularly with regard its Annex A, that lists the massacres.

See also
 Bombing of Wukro
 Wukro massacre (November 2020)
 Wukro massacre (December 2020)
 Wukro massacre (March 2021)

References

External links
World Peace Foundation: Starving Tigray

2021 massacres of the Tigray War
Massacres committed by Eritrea